High Maintenance is an American television and web series that premiered in 2012.

High Maintenance may also refer to:

 High Maintenance (Miranda Cosgrove EP), 2011
 High Maintenance (Saweetie EP), 2018
 "High Maintenance" (song), a 2011 song by Miranda Cosgrove
 "High Maintenance", a song by Meli'sa Morgan from the album I Remember, 2005
 High Maintenance, a 2001 novel by Jennifer Belle 
 High Maintenance, a 2006 film shown at the 56th Berlin International Film Festival